Kateřina Stradová also known as Anna Marie Stradová and Catherina Strada (c. 1568-1629), was the mistress of Rudolf II, Holy Roman Emperor, with whom she had six children.

Kateřina Stradová was the daughter of the painter Ottavio Strada the Elder, the sister of the painter Ottavio Strada the Younger, and the grand-daughter of the dealer and courtier Jacopo Strada. She became the mistress of Rudolf II at about the age of fifteen. She was given the title of countess.  They had six children, but only their eldest son is well attested in historical records. She was given the title of countess and is described as bright and attentive, educated in Vienna, and was said to have fine and gracious features.

Children
She had six children with Rudolf: 
 Don Julius Caesar d'Austria
 Matyáš d’Austria 
 Carlos d’Austria 
 Karolina d’Austria
 Dorothea d’Austria 
 Alžběta d’Austria

Movies
In the films The Emperor's Baker and The Baker's Emperor, she was played by Marie Vášová.

References

 JANÁČEK, Josef. Rudolf II. a jeho doba. 3. vyd. Praha ; Litomyšl: Paseka, 2003. 564 s. .
 Evans, R. J. W.. Rudolf II and his world: A study in intellectual history, 1576–1612. Oxford: Clarendon Press (1984).
 Janacek, Josef. Rudolf II and His Time. Prague; Litomyšl: Paseka (2003). .

16th-century Bohemian people
1560s births
1629 deaths
Royal mistresses
Rudolf II, Holy Roman Emperor